Jenn Colella (born Jennifer Lin Colella) is an American actress and singer. She began her career as a comedian and then branched out into musical theater. In her New York debut in Urban Cowboy, she earned a 2003 Outer Critics Circle Award nomination. More recently, she landed a Tony Award nomination, and won the Drama Desk Award, Outer Critics Circle Award, and three regional theater awards for her portrayal of Annette/Beverley Bass in Come from Away. She received a Grammy Award in January 2018 for her role for the Dear Evan Hansen original cast album. See: Awards and nominations
 
Along with Come from Away in 2017, she has been cast in the original Broadway productions of Urban Cowboy, High Fidelity (2006), Chaplin: The Musical (2012), and If/Then (2014), and Off-Broadway original productions of Slut (2005) and Lucky Guy (2011). Further Off-Broadway work included the title character in the Beebo Brinker Chronicles (2008), Closer Than Ever (2012), and a staged reading of Twelve Angry Men (2018) with an all-female cast.
 
In 2008 Colella performed in abridged versions of Girl Crazy and Side Show, two of the parts of Broadway: Three Generations at the Kennedy Center. The production celebrated the reopening of the renovated Eisenhower Theater. She also appeared in The Full Monty (2009) for the Paper Mill Playhouse in Millburn, New Jersey, which included Elaine Stritch as Jeanette, and the American premiere of Take Flight (2010), her first pilot role, for the McCarter Theatre in Princeton, New Jersey.
 
She has performed in over a half-dozen world premieres from Wisconsin to Florida and Massachusetts to California, including three at the La Jolla Playhouse in San Diego. From 2001 to 2019, there were four Peter Pans. Additionally, she has been cast multiple times at the New York Musical Theatre Festival. On television, she has made over a dozen appearances, starting in 2003 on the game show Can You Tell? through An Evening with Lerner and Loewe, the initial Broadway in Concert Series installment on PBS in 2022. Her film credits include the live capture of Come from Aways Broadway production.

Early life 
Colella was born to Lindy Crawford and Mick Colella, and grew up in Summerville, South Carolina Starting at eight, she sang in church and school concert and show choirs, which were where she learned to harmonize. In church, she also played handbells. She refers to herself as a choir nerd. Her mother has said of the eight year old, singing as an auctioneer in a school play, "She took the microphone in her hand, looked right at the audience, and this voice came out." People wondered where all the sound came from.

A local woman gave theatre lessons in her garage, and to earn money to take the classes, Colella did odd jobs about the woman's house, including painting the exterior. Her first role was Gertie in Oklahoma!. In seventh grade, she had a hunter education class, which she says helped make it comfortable to handle guns when she performed in Annie Get Your Gun. When, as part of a school group, she saw Phantom of the Opera in New York, she decided that she was going to be on stage.

While an undergraduate at Columbia College, she played basketball, tennis and flag football. During her senior year, she quarterbacked. She graduated in 1996 with a dual degree in speech and drama. Her family had moved to Hilton Head Island and had a golf store there. While working at the shop one summer during college, she taught herself to juggle. She stayed  in the area for three years and worked at an insurance company call center. In April 1997, she attended a Comet Carnival in Aiken, SC to observe Comet Hale–Bopp through a telescope. From 1997 to 1999 she was a member of The Sol Divers (initially The Gib Cats) rock 'n' roll band.

Colella served as a company member of the Trustus Theatre beginning in her senior year. At Trustus, starting in the fall of 1995 and running through the spring of 1999, she played Kitty in Taking Steps, The Angel in Angels in America (both parts), the title role in Sylvia (twice), Launcelot Gobbo in The Merchant of Venice, Amy in Company, Marta in Kiss of the Spider Woman, Teenage Greek Chorus in How I Learned to Drive, and Vivian in Free Will and Wanton Lust.

Colella went on to attend the University of California, Irvine, where she earned a Master of Fine Arts in Acting in 2002. While at UCI, she played Miss Jane in Floyd Collins, Puck in A Midsummer Night's Dream, Caterpillar in Alice in Wonderland, Princess Ninetta in The Love of Three Oranges, and Victoria Grant in Victor/Victoria  at the Barclay Theatre. In 2000 and 2001, she did summer stock at the Santa Rosa Summer Repertory Theatre, playing Dorothy in The Wizard of Oz, Peter in Peter Pan, and Val in A Chorus Line.

Career

Theatre 
As a UCI graduate, Colella participated in a showcase in New York, along with NYU and Yale, and auditioned for a part. After going back to California for a few months, she got a call to come back to New York to audition for Sissy in the original production of Urban Cowboy, and was cast in her Broadway debut role. She had not yet gotten her Equity card. The world premiere was at the Coconut Grove Playhouse, in Miami, Florida. Then it moved to the Broadhurst Theatre for its seven and one half weeks New York run. When the show closed, she returned to California and co-hosted a game show.

Among other original Broadway productions, her longest run, starting in March 2017, was two and one half years in Come from Away. In the summer of 2015 Colella originated the role of Annette/Beverley Bass in the La Jolla Playhouse's world premiere production, which transferred later in the year to the Seattle Repertory Theatre. It then played Washington D.C. at Ford's Theatre, a concert presentation in Gander, Newfoundland, and at the Royal Alex in Toronto in 2016 before transferring to Broadway at the Gerald Schoenfeld Theatre. The show received positive reviews and she was nominated for a Tony Award, along with winning both a Drama Desk Award and an Outer Critics Circle Award for her performance. After three years of performing the role over a  year span, she left the production on November 10, 2019. During the summer of 2022, she returned as a replacement for seven weeks and played her final performance in the Broadway production on August 7, 2022.

After the December 2013 world premiere run at the National Theatre in Washington, D.C., in March 2014, she started a year-long appearance in If/Then at the Richard Rodgers Theatre. Colella played Anne, a woman in a same-sex relationship with Kate. She had worked with the Kate role through development, but it was decided to cast LaChanze for the part. The role of Anne was then written in for her.

In Fall 2010, she also originated the role of Hedda Hopper in the world premiere of Limelight: The Story of Charlie Chaplin at the La Jolla Playhouse. It was renamed Chaplin: The Musical and she performed the role on Broadway from September 2012 to January 2013. An additional role was as Laura in High Fidelity. Colella played the world premiere in Boston in October 2006, and the original Broadway production in December of that year.

Her Off-Broadway original cast credits were a six-week run as Delia in Slut in 2005, two weeks in 2011 as Chicky Lay in Lucky Guy at the Little Shubert Theater, and a seven week long engagement in the 2022 world premiere of Suffs at the Public Theater. Colella's Off-Broadway work also included the butch title character in the Beebo Brinker Chronicles for seven weeks in early 2008, a four-week review, Closer Than Ever, during the summer of 2012,  and a single performance, all-female cast staged reading of Twelve Angry Men in September 2018.

After being in the original staged reading in Connecticut in 2006, she appeared in Kiki Baby, as an "utterly believable" four year old singer "you will fall in love with,"  who becomes a celebrity—and a spoiled brat. This titular characterization won Colella a 2011 NYMF Award for Outstanding Individual Performance. Other New York Musical Theatre Festival appearances include The Great American Trailer Park Musical in 2004 and 2009's All Fall Down. In 2006 she starred in the world premiere of Twyla Tharp's The Times They Are A-Changin' at the Old Globe Theatre.

Regional theatre
Colella has had multiple regional theater appearances. In addition to those listed above that moved on to New York, they have included her favorite role, Peter Pan, which she has done four times. Along with the 2001 California summer stock appearance, she has been cast in 2008 at the Sondheim Center in Fairfield, IA, the Music Circus in Sacramento, CA in 2015, and a 2019 Pittsburgh Civic Light Opera in Pennsylvania.

Also in Pittsburgh, she played Annie Oakley in Annie Get Your Gun in 2008. In 2009 she appeared, along with Elaine Stritch, in Paper Mill Playhouse's The Full Monty in Millburn, NJ. 2010 found her in Princeton, NJ at the McCarter Theatre in the American premiere of Take Flight as aviator Amelia Earhart. Another world premiere occurred in December 2003 for Madison Repertory  in Wisconsin as Jenny in Heartland: The Musical, followed by a January 2004 appearance in the show for the Broadway Contemporary Series in Dallas, TX.

Comedy, film, and television 
In the hopes of breaking into television, Colella began her career as a comedian as a way to get noticed. That, as well as the rock band, helped build her on stage confidence. She started doing observational humor stand-up in Southern California while pursuing her MFA. During that time, she performed in places such as the Laugh Factory and The Comedy Store in Hollywood. She has said that success and failure are equally valuable instructors.

She had her television debut in 2003 co-hosting the game show Can You Tell? with Tony Rock on Oxygen. Her next appearance was on the ABC series Cashmere Mafia, where she was in a same-sex relationship and discussed their starting a family. That show aired January 2008, six weeks before she opened in Beebo Brinker. Since then she has guest starred in several other television shows. In 2019, the year she left Come From Away, there were three for CBS, The Code, Madam Secretary, and Evil. Colella was also part of the PBS Tribute to Stephen Sondheim with the New York Philharmonic at Lincoln Center in 2010, and the initial Broadway in Concert: An Evening with Lerner and Loewe, again for PBS, in March 2022.

Her film credits are found in Uncertainty, Lay It Down for Good, the live filmed version of Come From Away, and Chocolate Milk.

Additional work
Colella has performed for online web shows. These include 2012's Pzazz 101 in the "Jenn Colella" episode and Hedda's Headlines: Backstage at 'Chaplin' with Jenn Colella where she reported from backstage over eight episodes of the Broadway.com Series. In 2014 she played Sarah Jeffreys in Submissions Only for two episodes titled "Chapter 2" and "Reason to Stay." 2017 saw her in another Broadway.com series over the eight episodes of Welcome to the Rock: Backstage at COME FROM AWAY with Jenn Colella. In 2021 she played Jo in all eight episodes of The Flame: A Podcast Musical.

In between other appearances, she teaches master classes, has a cabaret act, and does benefit performances. She sang the National Anthem at a New York Yankees game in October 2021. Colella has also co-written a song with Tom Kitt that was included in his album Reflect: Tom Kitt & The Collective.

Process
When Colella works on a project, she treats it as a hit and believes in it completely. But whether it is a hit is not the point, for her as an actor, it is to do her best work for as long as the show runs. She believes actors get hired not only because of talent, but because of their energy.  She feels the energy that an actor brings into the room must be practiced throughout the day, working toward the foundation of present moment awaremess. To her, acting is the easy part, staying in the present moment in her work is harder and requires focus. She recognizes that acting is the same whether on Broadway or in a local theater.

She says there are only two things over which an actor has control—preparation and attitude. Her work ethic is to arrive at rehearsal with lines memorized and music learned. She works to understand what is going on and to develop ideas about her character. She thinks a production staff wants to trust that the actor will do the work and not appear for rehearsal unprepared. They also want to know the actor will be a team player, someone they will want to work with during a development cycle that may take several years.

Colella says she enjoys rehearsing more than performing. It is for the safety afforded by the rehearsal room wherein the actors can play and flirt, try and fail, succeed and learn, and all without the judgement of an audience. She has indicated she feels sad after opening night, when the creative team is not there anymore, as it is like mom and dad are gone. They are no longer there to guide and approve the work being done. She loves the energy and approval received from an audience, but the safety, community, and feeling of family within rehearsal is not the same.

She treats signing-in at the theater as a contract between herself and the others in the company to be her best self while there, and knows practicing kindness requires attention. She does not mark in rehearsal, and has spent her career singing like it's the last time she'll sing. A reviewer has commented, "Colella is always singing at 100."

Personal life
Colella refers to kindness as her religion and believes in its practice. She tries to be respectful and pleasant to each person she meets.  A podcast host has said, "(she) might literally be the nicest person I've ever met," a former artistic director, "I've never seen her be cruel," and a composer/lyricist, "the most fun-loving, open-hearted, life-affirming person working in the theatre."

She identifies as mostly gay. Colella became engaged to Mo Mullen in June 2022 and they married October 4, 2022

Coming to New York, she was told by people she respected to stay in the closet, as it might cause casting problems. After playing a lesbian in Beebo Brinker, though, she was getting more attention and media questions, and finally felt it was time to come out. Colella has said, "being a queer woman in the Broadway community is something I'm very proud of."

Manoel Felciano, a co-star of Colella's in the movie Uncertainty, wrote the song "Jenn Colella" about her. The second line reads, "But I suspect, Jenn Colella, if my name were Isabella, then my clumsy overtures might stand a chance."

After having seen Phantom of the Opera on Broadway, she got a mask tattooed on her right arm to show her dedication to the craft. But then her first Broadway show, Urban Cowboy, was in the theater next to the Phantom theater. So she got a star to represent that show and cover the mask. A star represented guidance and light to her. Two other visible tattoos, on the backs of her upper arms, are "Kindness" and "Gratitude," which she got while in Come From Away.

While working on Come From Away, Colella became friends with Beverley Bass, the airline captain she portrayed in the show. They first met in San Diego at James' Place, a restaurant across from the La Jolla Playhouse, after the last preview performance. They had an immediate kinship. At closing night for the Seattle tryout run, Bass presented her with the flight jacket, wings, and service pin that she wore on September 11, to be worn on Broadway.

Credits

Stage

Television

Film

Webcast

Partial discography
These include cast albums and collections with a Colella solo track.

Awards and nominations

Notes

References

Sources

External links 

 
 
 
 
 
 
 

Living people
20th-century American actresses
21st-century American actresses
20th-century American women singers
20th-century American singers
21st-century American women singers
21st-century American singers
Actresses from South Carolina
American film actresses
American lesbian actresses
American musical theatre actresses
American television actresses
Dora Mavor Moore Award winners
Musicians from South Carolina
University of California, Irvine alumni
Year of birth missing (living people)